Elvino is a male given name. Notable people with the name include:
Elvino de Brito (1851–1902), Portuguese military man
Elvino Silveira Sousa, Canadian engineering professor
Elvino Vardaro (1905–1971), Argentine tango composer and violinist

Masculine given names